Air Vice Marshal Charles Dempster Breese,  (23 April 1889 – 5 March 1941) was an officer in the Royal Navy and a senior officer in the Royal Air Force in the first half of the 20th century.

Honours
1933 – Companion of the Order of the Bath for valuable services rendered in connection with the operations in Northern Kurdistan, Iraq during the period December 1931 to June 1932.

References

External links
Air of Authority – A History of RAF Organisation – Air Vice-Marshal C D Breese

 

|-
 

1889 births
1941 deaths
Companions of the Order of the Bath
Recipients of the Air Force Cross (United Kingdom)
Royal Air Force air marshals
Royal Air Force personnel of World War I
Royal Naval Air Service aviators
Royal Navy officers